The Croatia national football B team a secondary football team run occasionally as support for the Croatia national football team.

Croatia's B team played three matches so far, all of them friendlies against respective B teams. Its first match played in 1993 against Italy ended in a 3–1 defeat. Croatia's B team then played against France in 1999, losing 2–0. In 2001 they met with Romania in a game that ended in a 2–2 draw. This is so far the last match played by Croatia's B team.

Fixtures

See also 

 Croatia men's national football team
 Croatia men's national under-23 football team
 Croatia men's national under-21 football team
 Croatia men's national under-20 football team
 Croatia men's national under-19 football team
 Croatia men's national under-18 football team
 Croatia men's national under-17 football team
 Croatia men's national under-16 football team
 Croatia men's national under-15 football team
 Croatia women's national football team
 Croatia women's national under-19 football team
 Croatia women's national under-17 football team

Footnotes

References 

 
 
 

Croatia national football team
European national B association football teams